St John Thackeray (1778–1824)  was a collector and political agent, who was working in south India for British East India Company during the 1820s.

Early life
St John Thackeray was working as a collector and political agent, for Southern Mahratta Doab region of British East India Company and he belonged to Madras Civil Service.

Attack on Kittur

Background

The Kittur Kingdom, founded in 1585 by one Desai, was ruled by Mallasarja, who was childless, with Kittur Chennamma as the queen. Mallasarja died in 1824, and whether he adopted a boy before his death was a fact contested by St John Thackeray. Holding that the adoption was either false or forged, Thackeray marched to Kittur. Upon arriving, Thackeray sought to administer the territory. He sealed the treasury in an attempt to confiscate its treasure and jewels. Kittur Chennamma protested and closed the gates of the fort. Thackeray gave the order to blow up the gates, and in the meantime, one of Chennamma's soldiers shot Thackeray.

Death

St John Thackeray was killed on 23 October 1824  at Kittur, Karnataka, when he was waging a war against Kittur Chennamma, the Rani (Queen) of Kittur. It was observed that he along with other forces tried to enter into fortified town of Kittur with "inadequate means". First he was shot in the stomach as he rode towards the fort and was later hacked to death by a Kittur swordsman. Amateur Balappa, one of the lieutenants of Kittur Chennamma, was involved in killing Thackeray.

Memorial

An obelisk was constructed at Dharwar in memory of Thackeray.

References

British East India Company people
History of Karnataka
Year of birth unknown
Year of death unknown
1824 deaths
1778 births